Ladaaku is a 1981 Indian drama film directed by Dinesh Ramanesh.

References

External links

1981 films
1980s Hindi-language films